Field-Marshal Shree Shree Shree Maharaja Sir Mohan Shumsher Jung Bahadur Rana, GCB, GCIE, GBE (23 December 1885 – 6 January 1967) was the prime minister and foreign minister of Nepal from 30 April 1948 until 12 November 1951.

He was the last prime minister from the Rana family, which had controlled Nepal for more than a century and reduced the monarchy to a figurehead. He was the son of the 5th Rana Prime Minister of Nepal Chandra Shumsher and Bada Maharani Chandra Loka Bhakta Lakshmi Devi. He became prime minister at a time when the king, Tribhuvan  was attempting to assert himself. Tribhuvan wanted to establish a stronger monarchy and some democracy, which Mohan Shumsher opposed.

In 1950, Mohan Shumsher's policies against the monarchy forced Tribhuvan and his son Mahendra to flee to India with the help of the Indian Residency and the Indian government, which led Mohan Shumsher to proclaim Mahendra's three-year-old son Gyanendra  the king of Nepal.

Later in the revolution of 1951, Tribhuvan returned to Nepal after signing The Delhi Treaty between Mohan Shumsher, Tribhuvan and Nepali Congress thus restoring his throne and bringing the stately power back to the monarch. By the end of 1951, the king and his allies, the Nepali Congress had triumphed, and Mohan Shumsher and the rest of the Rana family lost power. The Ranas were deprived of all the hereditary offices and privileges conferred by king Surendra Bikram Shah on Jung Bahadur even though Mohan Shumsher still held the office of the prime minister for until several demonstrations by Ranas in an attempt to reestablish their rule and the opposition of the monarchy and Nepali Congress forced him to resign from his position.

Death
On 14 December 1951, Mohan Shumsher went into self-imposed exile in India, and died in Bangalore in 1967, aged 81.

Family
In 1900, he married Bada Maharani Dikshya Kumari, second daughter of Kunwar Indar Bir Singh Rathor, of Marma Doti. He had two sons and six daughters, 
His Highness General Maharajkumar Sharda Shamsher Jung Bahadur Rana, elder son. He was the father of five children, two sons and three daughters, and all his daughters were given in marriage to high-ranking Rajput Maharajas. His children were:
Deepak Shamsher Jung Bahadur Rana, elder son
Mukund Shamsher Jung Bahadur Rana, younger son
HH Maharani Mukut Rajya Lakshmi Devi, wife of HH Maharaja Raghunath Singh Bhati of Jaisalmer
HH Maharani Yasho Rajya Lakshmi Devi, wife of HH Maharaja Karan Singh Dogra of Jammu and Kashmir
Bharati/Chaitanya Rajya Lakshmi, wife of HH Maharaja Shatrushalya Singh Jadeja of Nawanagar (Jamnagar). She divorced her husband and married a Punjabi businessman.
His Highness General Yuvaraja Bijay Shamsher Jung Bahadur Rana, younger son but he was the heir apparent. Married and had four daughters and a son (two daughters are twins) and had two grandchildren, one granddaughter married the  Yuvaraja of Singrauli (one of the most highest ranked princely states) -
 Pashupati Shamsher Jang Bahadur Rana, he is a politician who held several ministerial positions in the government of Nepal at various times. He married Usharaje Scindia, the second daughter of Maharaja Jiwajirao Scindia of Gwalior by his wife Maharani Vijayaraje Scindia. They became the parents of two daughters:
Urvashi Rana, married an Indian businessman from the Marwadi community. They have three daughters.
Devyani Rana married Yuvaraja of Singrauli State Aishvarya Singh, son of HH Maharaja Bhuvaneshwar Prasad Singh of Singrauli. They have one child- Adidev Singh who is the Chotte Yuvaraja of Singrauli.
 HH Ganga Rajya Laxmi who is married to HH Maharaja Ranjeet Singh Judeo of the Samthar State who is a six-term Member of the Legislative Assembly. They have one daughter - Niharika Raje who is married to a fellow royal and the titular crown prince of the Dholpur State Dushyant Singh. They have two children - Bhairavi Vijaya Raje and Vinayak Pratap Singh
 Jamuna Rajya Laxmi
 Jyoti Rajya Laxmi

Dharma Rajya Lakshmi Devi. Married to Maharaj Devi Singh, fourth son of HH Maharaja Umaid Singh of Jodhpur.
Rani Sahiba Moha Bakhta Rajya Lakshmi Devi, married to Raja Pashupati Pratap Narayan Singh Bahadur of Bansi in Uttar Pradesh.
Rani Sahiba Thagendra Rajya Lakshmi Devi, married to Rao Udai Singh of Patan, Rajasthan.
Rani Sahiba Roop Rajya Lakshmi Devi, married to Rawal Sangram Singh of Samode in Rajasthan.
Rani Sahiba Mahendra Rajya Lakshmi Devi, married to Rana Shivambar Singh of Khajurgaon.
Rani Sahiba Sharada Rajya Lakshmi Devi, married to Raja Girish Chandra Jadumoni Deo Jenamani of Rairakhol State in Orissa.
HH Rani Sahiba Leela Rajya Lakshmi, married to HH Maharaja Sir Arimardam Singh Ju Deo Bahadur of Charkhari State in Bundelkhand.

See also 
 Mohan SJB Rana cabinet, 1951

References 

|-

1885 births
1967 deaths
Prime ministers of Nepal
Honorary Knights Grand Cross of the Order of the Bath
Honorary Knights Grand Commander of the Order of the Indian Empire
Honorary Knights Grand Cross of the Order of the British Empire
Nepalese military personnel
Nepalese exiles
Grand Croix of the Légion d'honneur
Rana regime
Rana dynasty
Foreign Ministers of Nepal
20th-century prime ministers of Nepal
20th-century Nepalese nobility
19th-century Nepalese nobility
Children of prime ministers of Nepal
Nepalese Hindus